Susan Bradley (born 1940) is a Canadian psychiatrist.

Susan Bradley may also refer to:

Susan Hinckley Bradley (1851–1929), American painter